The Monte-Carlo Masters is an annual tennis tournament for male professional players held in Roquebrune-Cap-Martin, France, a commune that borders on Monaco. The event is part of the ATP Tour Masters 1000 on the Association of Tennis Professionals (ATP) Tour. The tournament is played on clay courts and is held every year in the April–May period.

The Monte Carlo tennis championship was first held in 1897. It became an "Open" event in 1969. From 1970 through 1973 and from 1976 through 1989 it was a major tournament of the Grand Prix Tour. In 1973 the tournament was part of the Rothmans Spring Mediterranean Circuit. From 1974 through 1977 the tournament was part of the World Championship Tennis (WCT) circuit. In 1990 it became an ATP Championship Series Single Week tennis event.

Beginning in 2009, Monte Carlo became the only Masters 1000 tournament not to have a mandatory player commitment. Most of the top players still elect to play the event despite this status.

Rafael Nadal won the title eight consecutive times between 2005 and 2012, making him the only player to win eight consecutive titles at the same tournament. In 2017, contesting his 11th final against Albert Ramos Viñolas, he won the title for an Open Era record 10th time. The following year, Nadal improved this record to 11 wins in a final against Kei Nishikori.

Past finals

Men's singles

Men's doubles 
Open era:

Records
Source: The tennisbase

Singles

Doubles

Notes

References

External links

 Official tournament website
 ATP tournament profile
 Official live streaming of all matches

 

 
Tennis tournaments in France
Tennis tournaments in Monaco
Clay court tennis tournaments
Recurring sporting events established in 1897
1897 establishments in Monaco
ATP Tour Masters 1000
Sport in Monte Carlo
Annual sporting events in France
Spring (season) events in Monaco
Rolex sponsorships